Knowin' You're Around is the debut album by contemporary Christian musician, Twila Paris.

Track listing

References

1980 debut albums
Twila Paris albums